is a weapon-based 3D fighting game developed by Project Soul and produced by Namco. It is the second game in the Soulcalibur series, preceded by Soul Edge in December 1995. Originally released in arcades on July 30, 1998, it ran on the Namco System 12 hardware. It was ported to the Dreamcast in 1999 with new features and improved graphics. The North American version was released in September 1999 as a launch game for the Dreamcast and was part of the successful launch of the new console. It became available as a downloadable title on the Xbox 360's Xbox Live Marketplace in July 2008 and it is forward compatible with the Xbox One along with the sequel, Soulcalibur II.

The game centers on the pursuit of the legendary weapon known as Soul Edge, now in the possession of a warrior known as Nightmare, who slaughters countless people to satisfy the blade's bloodlust. Other warriors pursue him either to claim the weapon for themselves or to destroy it, end his mass murder, and free him of its curse. Developed closely with Namco's Tekken development team, it is one of the few home console ports that outdid their arcade parent performance-wise. The title brought many innovations to the fighting game genre that include a heavy emphasis on weapons and a unique eight-way movement system.

Soulcalibur received unanimous critical applause upon release; it is the fourth-highest-rated video game of all time, with a 98 rating on Metacritic. It won the majority of Game of the Year awards in its respective year, and is widely regarded as one of the greatest fighting games and one of the greatest video games ever made, topping numerous "best of" lists in years following.

Gameplay

One of the biggest innovations introduced by Soulcalibur to the gameplay system of its predecessor, Soul Edge, is the eight-way run. Previous 3D fighters had only limited movement along the third axis, with sidesteps and rolls providing useful but unsustained lateral movement. In Soulcalibur, simply holding down a joystick direction causes the character to move in that direction, giving the player a sense of freedom and deepening the strategy of the game.

Soulcalibur also improved gameplay with "forgiving buffering", executing the input for one move before the player's character has finished recovering from his or her previous move, and leads to executing a quick succession of moves (other fighting games such as the Tekken and Virtua Fighter series have relatively strict buffering requirements, meaning expert timing is required to pull off many combinations, but Soulcalibur features much more lenient timing to successfully execute a buffer). Finally, the Guard Impact offensive blocking maneuver shown in Soul Edge was given a deeper range of techniques in Soulcalibur, allowing players to push back or redirect attacks past themselves as well as swatting away an opponent's weapon to stun them.

Characters

Soulcalibur was originally planned to be a dramatic overhaul, with all new characters apart from Mitsurugi from Soul Edge. However, nine of the 11 characters from Soul Edge ended up carrying over to Soulcalibur by the time the roster was finalized in the Dreamcast version (Cervantes, Hwang, Seong Mi-na, Mitsurugi, Rock, Siegfried, Sophitia, Taki, Voldo), with an additional ten new characters joining the ranks (in the South Korean version of the game, Mitsurugi was replaced by an English-Japanese swordsman named Arthur).

As with many fighting games, many of the new characters were heavily styled after existing characters from the franchise. For example, new character Maxi has a fighting style and move set influenced by Soul Edge's Li Long (the only of the original starting characters not to return). In fact, Soulcalibur only added one original playing style, belonging to Ivy. New characters Xianghua, Maxi, Yoshimitsu, Astaroth, Kilik, Nightmare, and Lizardman were based upon existing characters Hwang, Li Long, Mitsurugi, Rock, Seong Mi-na, Siegfried, and Sophitia, respectively. Consequently, Namco has been working since Soulcalibur to gradually separate the individual styles of the characters in order to make each one unique.

Plot
The mystical sword of the legends, the "Soul Edge", ended up in the hands of the dreaded pirate Cervantes de Leon of Spain. For the next 25 years, he stayed dormant on the remnants of a Spanish port town, taking the souls of those who reached him during their search of the sword. Like Soul Edge, starts in the year 1583. The reign of terror of Cervantes was soon to start, but through the joined efforts of Greek divine warrior Sophitia Alexandra and Japanese ninja Taki, he was stopped and killed, with one of the twin Soul Edge blades being shattered in the process. As it was about to tear itself apart, young German knight Siegfried Schtauffen approached the port town and battled Cervantes, whose corpse had been momentarily reanimated through Soul Edge's will. After emerging victorious, Siegfried's attention turned unto the sword. The moment he took the hilt of the cursed blade, Soul Edge released a bright column of light into the sky. This was known as the "Evil Seed", bound to bring calamity and death in its wake.

Three years after those events, in 1586 AD, Soul Edge uses Siegfried as its host, and now Siegfried is Nightmare, a knight wearing azure armor and sporting a hideously deformed right arm. Europe plunges into a vortex of slaughters as he and his followers claim souls to strengthen the blade in its weakened state. Unknown to them, a group of warriors met on their journey to stop Soul Edge, and with them, three sacred weapons join once again.

Development
After releasing Soul Edge, Namco took some time to evaluate what had made the game successful before jumping into the development of its sequel. Producer Hiroaki Yotoriyama decided to give the sequel a new name instead of just calling it Soul Edge 2 in order to have a fresh start and take the series in a new direction. The name Soulcalibur is a portmanteau of the word soul (as in Soul Edge) and King Arthur's sword Excalibur (ultimately, the name would be used within the game's universe for the holy weapon which would counteract Soul Edge's evil). Inspired by an internal Namco prototype featuring a character able to run openly in a field, the eight-way run system was implemented. Upon application, the development team was surprised at how well it meshed with their fighting system and decided to build the rest of the game around it. During development they worked closely with Namco's Tekken development team, sharing ideas and research. Yotoriyama felt that with that cooperation and partnership, they were able to develop "the greatest weapon-based fighting action game in the world".

Yotoriyama has described the game's concept as expressing "fun and diversity in weapon combat", citing the contrast in how one weapon would affect gameplay compared to another and how they would react to each other upon clashing. Each character's fighting style was designed to revolve around their weapon, though he noted that because of the differences they experienced difficulty in balancing the gameplay. He described the availability of movement in comparison to Tekken 3 as a large contrast between the two series and more tactical and emphasized how it interacted with the game's "ring out" feature. Each character in Soulcalibur was designed around the idea that they could be viewed as a real person could, and to this end, motion creator Masataka Ishiguro emphasized the arm and leg movements for each character in relation to their weapon, wanting players to "feel the individual motions and the realism within the game"

The team for the arcade version of Soulcalibur consisted of roughly 60 people working on Namco's System 12 hardware, while the team developing the home port was reduced to about forty. Given a deadline of seven months to coincide with the North American launch of the Dreamcast, the transition was difficult for the team, due to the differences in hardware. However, due to the similar capabilities and limits of each system, content was left intact between the two versions, with Yotoriyama feeling that the team was "obsessed" with giving their best effort for the port. The biggest technological change to the Dreamcast port was to render all of the game's stages in full 3D polygons, whereas the far backgrounds in the arcade original were flat, two-dimensional images. Additional content was also added to the game to ensure replay value, based on researching other fighting games marketed at the time. Many of the team's ideas that they were unable to incorporate into the port were eventually used for later games in the series.

Release
The game was originally released in the Japanese arcades on July 30, 1998. A Gamest Book series guide book Soul Calibur Skill Up Manual (ソウルキャリバー スキルアップマニュアル) was published by Shinseisha on September 27, 1998.

Dreamcast
The Dreamcast port of Soulcalibur was released in Japan on August 5, 1999; and in North America as a launch title, on September 9, 1999. The North American Dreamcast version of the game removes one of Voldo's suggestive codpieces featuring a bull. However, the codpiece is present in the European and Japanese versions, as well as the North American Xbox 360 version. The European Dreamcast version was distributed and advertised by Sega Europe.

The Dreamcast version of Soulcalibur is one of the first examples of a home conversion of a game being graphically superior to its original arcade counterpart. Among the differences were the improved graphics (including the addition of 3D backgrounds), tweaked gameplay, new game modes, new costumes, and the inclusion of an extra character, Cervantes de Leon. The Dreamcast version features new modes such as Team Battle, Survival, and Training Mode. In Mission Battle, the player completes various missions to attain points, which can be used to buy various art, which then unlocks extra features, costumes and stages. Another feature added is the artwork section, containing official artwork, fanart, and high-res pictures. Also unlockable are a "liquid metal" version of the characters' costume and a "Battle Theater" mode, plus a way to modify the opening introduction theme by changing the characters appearing in it, and an "Exhibition Mode" displaying characters performing their katas (in Mission Mode it is possible to add more characters to the "Exhibition Mode", such as Taki and Seung Mina).

Xbox 360 (Xbox Live Arcade)
In 2008, Namco Bandai Games announced a port of Soulcalibur would be released for the Xbox 360. The port was based on the European Dreamcast version and was made available for download on Xbox Live Arcade on July 2, 2008. While the game included HD updated graphics and various Live leaderboards, online play was absent which makes it an exception amongst most games ported to Xbox Live Arcade. Other features from the Dreamcast version (Museum, etc., with the exception of Mission Battle) are also in the game. While the intro is removed from this port, the intro music is still in this port. All content is unlocked by the start of the game. The game is no longer available in the Microsoft Store.

iOS (iPad, iPhone, iPod Touch)
On January 19, 2012, Namco Bandai released a port of Soulcalibur for Apple's iOS platform. Game modes in this version include Arcade, Time Attack, Survival, Extra Survival, Practice, and Museum mode. The game was released as a Universal App to run at native resolutions on iPad, iPhone, and iPod touch. The game is no longer available in the iOS store.

Android
On November 20, 2013, Namco Bandai released a port of Soulcalibur for the Android platform. The app makes use of Google Play Games for synchronization between devices and runs at native resolution and screen aspect ratio. The game is no longer available in the Google Play Store.

Reception

In Japan, Game Machine listed Soulcalibur on their September 1, 1998 issue as being the third most-successful arcade game of the month.

The Dreamcast version of Soulcalibur sold in excess of one million copies by December 1999. It is the second biggest selling game on the system. It won the 1999 E3 Game Critics Award for "Best Fighting Game" and the AIAS Interactive Achievement Awards for 1999's "Console Game of the Year" and "Console Fighting Game of the Year" (along with a nomination for "Game of the Year").

Blake Fischer reviewed the Dreamcast version of the game for Next Generation, rating it five stars out of five, and stated that "Beautiful, deep, and far more compelling than any 3D fighter in recent memory, Soul Calibur is reason enough to own a Dreamcast."

The game received universal critical acclaim, garnering perfect 10/10 scores from GameSpot and IGN, and was for nearly a decade the last game to receive a perfect rating from IGN, until the release of Grand Theft Auto IV in 2008. It is the second game ever to get a perfect 40/40 from Japanese gaming magazine Famitsu (the first being The Legend of Zelda: Ocarina of Time). As of 2017, game review aggregator website GameRankings has the Dreamcast version ranked as the seventh best-reviewed game of all time, as well as being the highest-scoring title in the fighting game genre.

The Dreamcast version of Soulcalibur also holds a score of 98, making it one of the highest-rated video games of all time across all consoles and platforms, on Metacritic.

Retrospective
Soulcalibur was named as the number one best Dreamcast game by Game Informer. In 2009, IGN ranked Soulcalibur as the fifth best Dreamcast game, while ScrewAttack ranked it sixth. GamesRadar named Soulcalibur the best Dreamcast game of all time on their list. In 2005, GameSpot ranked Soulcalibur as the sixth best launch title yet, calling it "not only one of the greatest launch games or one of the greatest fighters, but one of the greatest games ever. Period."

In addition, it is often considered to be one of the greatest games on all platforms, including:

Game Informer (2001): "The Top 100 Games of All Time" (74th place). 
IGN (2003): "Top 100 Games" (38th place).
Retro Gamer (2004): "Top 100 Games" (75th place).
IGN (2005): "Top 100 Games" (43rd place). 
IGN (2006): "Readers' Choice The Top 100 Games Ever" (sixth place). 
Electronic Gaming Monthly (2006): "The Greatest 200 Videogames of Their Time" (22nd place). 
ScrewAttack (2007): "Top Ten Fighting Games" (seventh place).
Cinema Blend (2008): "Top 10 Best Fighting Games of All Time" (fourth place).
UGO.com (2010): "Top 25 Fighting Games of All Time" (second place). 
Complex (2011): "The 50 Best Fighting Games of All Time" (fifth place). 
Game Informer (2019) 3rd best fighting game of all time

Notes

References

External links

 

3D fighting games
1998 video games
Arcade video games
Censored video games 
Dreamcast games
Interactive Achievement Award winners
Android (operating system) games
IOS games
Bandai Namco games
Soulcalibur series games
Fighting games
Video game sequels
Video games developed in Japan
Video games scored by Junichi Nakatsuru
Video games set in the 16th century
Xbox 360 Live Arcade games
D.I.C.E. Award for Fighting Game of the Year winners